Ancita varicornis is a species of beetle in the family Cerambycidae. It was described by Ernst Friedrich Germar in 1848. It is known from Australia.

References

Ancita
Beetles described in 1848